is a Japanese professional footballer who plays as a goalkeeper for J1 League club Hokkaido Consadole Sapporo.

Career statistics

References

External links

Profile at Hokkaido Consadole Sapporo

1989 births
Living people
Association football people from Kumamoto Prefecture
Japanese footballers
J1 League players
J2 League players
Urawa Red Diamonds players
Giravanz Kitakyushu players
Albirex Niigata players
Hokkaido Consadole Sapporo players
Association football goalkeepers